The Elkhart-LaGrange Amish affiliation is the second largest Old Order Amish affiliation and as such a subgroup of Amish. Its origin and main settlement lie in Elkhart and LaGrange counties in Indiana. While the Amish of Holmes County, Ohio, and adjacent counties split into several different affiliations in the last 100 years, the Elkhart-LaGrange affiliation remained united, but with a considerable internal diversity. The Elkhart-LaGrange affiliation had 177 church districts in 2011.

History 

The Elkhart-LaGrange Amish settlement was founded in 1841.

Practice and belief 

The Elkhart-LaGrange Amish affiliation is quite liberal compared to other Amish affiliations concerning the use of technology. Regulations of the Ordnung may vary  considerably from district to neighboring district as can be seen in the table below, where "some" (yellow) indicates non-uniform regulations:

Settlements and districts 

In 2011 the Elkhart-LaGrange affiliation was present in 3 states in 9 settlements with 177 church districts, forming the second largest Amish affiliation. It represents about 7 percent of the Old Order Amish population, that is about 20,000 people out of about 300,000 in 2015. It is the most geographically concentrated of the larger Amish affiliations.

References

Literature 
 Charles Hurst and David McConnell: An Amish Paradox. Diversity and Change in the World's Largest Amish Community,  Johns Hopkins University Press, Baltimore MD 2010 
 Steven Nolt and Thomas J. Meyers: Plain Diversity: Amish Cultures and Identities, Baltimore MD 2007. 
 Thomas J. Meyers and Steven M. Nolt: An Amish Patchwork: Indiana's Old Orders in the Modern World. Bloomington, IN et al. 2005. 
 Donald B. Kraybill: The Riddle of Amish Culture, Baltimore MD 2001. 
 Donald B. Kraybill, Karen M. Johnson-Weiner and Steven M. Nolt: The Amish, Johns Hopkins University Press, Baltimore MD 2013. 

Old Order Amish